Brad Chartrand (born December 14, 1974) is a Canadian former ice hockey right winger who had a five-year career in the National Hockey League with the Los Angeles Kings between 1999 and 2004. He played in 215 regular season games, scoring 25 goals and assists for 50 points, picking up 122 penalty minutes.

Chartrand was born in Winnipeg, Manitoba.

Career statistics

Regular season and playoffs

External links
 

1974 births
Living people
Canadian ice hockey right wingers
Cornell Big Red men's ice hockey players
Ice hockey people from Winnipeg
Long Beach Ice Dogs (IHL) players
Los Angeles Kings players
Lowell Lock Monsters players
Manchester Monarchs (AHL) players
SC Rapperswil-Jona Lakers players
St. James Canadians players
St. John's Maple Leafs players
Undrafted National Hockey League players